is a Japanese football player currently playing for V-Varen Nagasaki.

Club statistics
Updated to 1 March 2019.

References

External links

1989 births
Living people
Association football people from Saitama Prefecture
Japanese footballers
J1 League players
J2 League players
FC Tokyo players
Cerezo Osaka players
Shonan Bellmare players
Fagiano Okayama players
V-Varen Nagasaki players
Association football midfielders